The 1983–84 UC Irvine Anteaters men's basketball team represented the University of California, Irvine during the 1983–84 NCAA Division I men's basketball season. The Anteaters were led by fourth year head coach Bill Mulligan and played their home games at the Crawford Hall. They were members of the Pacific Coast Athletic Association. They finished the season 19–10 and 14–4 in PCAA play.

Previous season 
The 1982–83 Anteaters returned only two players from the 1981–82 Anteaters team that won 23 wins and finished with a record of 16–12 and 8–8 in PCAA play.

Off-season

Incoming transfers

Roster

Schedule

|-
!colspan=9 style=|Non-Conference Season

|-
!colspan=9 style=|Conference Season

|-
!colspan=9 style=| PCAA tournament

Source

Awards and honors
Ben McDonald
AP Honorable Mention All-American
PCAA First Team All-Conference
George Turner
PCAA All-Freshman Team
Source:

References

UC Irvine Anteaters men's basketball seasons
Uc Irvine
UC Irvine Anteaters
UC Irvine Anteaters